Safina Saima Khar is a Pakistani politician who served as a member of the Provincial Assembly of the Punjab from 2008 to 2013 on the reserved seat for women on the ticket of Pakistan Peoples Party.

Family
She was married to a former member of the National Assembly Malik Arbi Khar, a prominent member of a landlord family in Muzaffargarh. She has two children.

References

Punjab MPAs 2008–2013
Safina Saima
People from Muzaffargarh
People from Muzaffargarh District
Politicians from Muzaffargarh